Preston Lea "Trey" Spruance III (born August 14, 1969) is an American composer, producer, and musician who co-founded the experimental rock band Mr. Bungle. He is also leader of the multi-genre outfit Secret Chiefs 3. Originally a guitarist and trumpeter, in the early 90s Spruance began playing vintage electronic organs, analog synthesizers, saz, santur, electric sitar, tar, and various other string and percussion instruments. In the mid 90s he founded Forking Paths Studio where his production techniques were applied to Mr. Bungle and Secret Chiefs 3 records among many others. Since 2007 Spruance's Secret Chiefs 3 has been a very active live entity, performing well over 500 shows in more than 50 countries.

Spruance's playing and composition style is influenced by many diverse genres of music, such as surf rock, Anatolian folk, death metal, film music, Afghan rebab music, ska, funk, space rock, jazz and Japanoise. Musique concrète and foley work also play a large role in his recordings.

Career
Spruance was a founding member of Mr. Bungle, along with Mike Patton and Trevor Dunn. He has focused on his band Secret Chiefs 3 for the last 15 years (though it began in 1996), and its seven "satellite" groups first introduced on the 2004 album Book of Horizons. Though once secular, Spruance began exploring religious and philosophical themes in Mr. Bungle and Secret Chiefs 3 in the mid-1990s, after joining the Eastern Orthodox Church. 

In 2013 he arranged his music for the 61-piece Traditional Russian Orchestra of Krasnoyarsk and performed with them in Kansk, Siberia, alongside other members of Secret Chiefs 3. He has performed regularly with John Zorn and has arranged two releases of works from Zorn's Masada Songbooks for Secret Chiefs 3: "Xaphan" in 2007, and "Beriah". He contributed guitar and tubular bells to two albums by the drone metal band Asva, with whom he toured the US and Europe. He also recorded with Patton and Faith No More on their 1995 album King for a Day... Fool for a Lifetime.

In 2016 Spruance composed a three movement string quartet titled "Séraphîta" for San Francisco's Kronos Quartet. The piece was premiered by Kronos at the Haydnsaal at Schloss Esterházy in Vienna, and at SFJAZZ Center in the USA. Kronos has also performed the piece at Carnegie Hall and for an engagement with the Alonzo King LINES Ballet. In Australia "Séraphîta" has been performed by the Black Square String Quartet.

As a producer
Besides his own bands, Spruance has also worked as a producer for others. In 2020 he produced "Alphaville" for NYC avant garde black metal group Imperial Triumphant, and is currently producing their next record. He produced the album Death After Life for Oakland, CA death metal group Impaled. Production duties for other bands include Neil Hamburger, Dengue Fever, The Tuna Helpers, Faxed Head, Tub Ring and many others.

Record label
Spruance is the founder of Web of Mimicry, which has released albums from a variety of different bands, including  Cleric, Fat32, Sleepytime Gorilla Museum, Brazzaville, Matt Chamberlain, Dengue Fever, and ASVA, amongst others.

Discography

Mr. Bungle

 The Raging Wrath of the Easter Bunny (1986)
 Bowel of Chiley (1987)
 Goddammit I Love America! (1988)
 OU818 (1989)
 Mr. Bungle (1991)
 Disco Volante (1995)
 California (1999)
 The Raging Wrath of the Easter Bunny Demo (2020)

Secret Chiefs 3

 First Grand Constitution and Bylaws (1996)
 Second Grand Constitution and Bylaws: Hurqalya (1998)
 Eyes of Flesh, Eyes of Flame (1999)
 Book M (2001)
 Book of Horizons (2004)
 Path of Most Resistance (retrospective and rarities album) (2007)
 Xaphan: Book of Angels Volume 9 (2008)
 Traditionalists: Le Mani Destre Recise Degli Ultimi Uomini (2009)
 Satellite Supersonic Vol. 1 (2010)
 Book of Souls: Folio A (2013)
 "Perichoresis" (2014)

Faxed Head

 Uncomfortable But Free (1995)
 Exhumed at Birth (1997)
 Chiropractic (2001)

Faith No More

 King for a Day... Fool for a Lifetime (1995)

Weird Little Boy

 Weird Little Boy (1998)

Band membership
Secret Chiefs 3
Mr. Bungle
Faxed Head (as "Neck Head")
Noddingturd Fan (also NT Fan)
Scourge
Asva
The Three Doctors Band
Plainfield
The Bon Larvis Band
Faith No More

References

External links
 The Trey Spruance Gallery – a comprehensive list of Spruance's live and recorded projects
 Web of Mimicry
 Mimicry Records – Spruance's record label
 Official Site of Secret Chiefs 3 – official website containing member line-up and photos.

1969 births
Living people
American rock guitarists
American male guitarists
American people of Hungarian descent
Record producers from California
Eastern Orthodox Christians from the United States
Converts to Eastern Orthodoxy
People from Eureka, California
Place of birth missing (living people)
Guitarists from California
Faith No More members
Mr. Bungle members
American multi-instrumentalists
20th-century American guitarists